Deckchairs Overboard were an Australian pop music band based in Sydney which formed in 1982 and disbanded in 1985. The early line-up featured Ken Campbell on vocals, guitar, and drums; John Clifforth on vocals, guitar, and keyboards; Paul Hester on drums (later of Split Enz and Crowded House); and Cathy McQuade on bass guitar and vocals. Most of the group's initial members had been in the Melbourne group The Cheks (1980–1982) with the exception of McQuade, who had been a member of The Ears.

Deckchairs Overboard released the minor hit singles "That's The Way" (1983), with Campbell on vocals, "Shout", (1983) with McQuade on vocals, "Walking in the Dark" (1984) and "Fight For Love" (1985) both with Clifforth on vocals, all of which received airplay on TV and radio. After Hester left in 1983 they had a series of drummers including Matthew Wenban and Michael Davis. Michael Hoste, an ex-member of Flowers and Icehouse played keyboards with the group in 1983.

McQuade and Clifforth  were involved in ABC's TV series Sweet and Sour (1984) supplying the singing voice for two of the lead actors, McQuade also provided bass guitar; Deckchairs Overboard also performed "That's the Way" for the soundtrack. The film I Can't Get Started (1985), starring John Waters had two Deckchairs Overboard tracks, "Mixed Low" and "Legion", on its soundtrack. 

In 2011, Clifforth released Craven's Pharmacy, featuring work with Hester. Catherine McQuade released a solo album, Perfect Storm in 2019 and an EP, ''Life is Elsewhere' in 2021.

Discography

Albums

Extended Play

Singles

References

External links
 Discography on Discogs

Musical groups established in 1982
Musical groups disestablished in 1985
Australian pop music groups
New South Wales musical groups
1982 establishments in Australia